The 2008 TeleChoice Premier League season was the eighth season of the revamped NSW Premier League. This season also marked the promotion of two new teams, in the West Sydney Berries and the Macarthur Rams from the Super League (one division lower). This increased the teams competing in the competition from 10 to 12 teams and the number of rounds from 18 to 22 in the regular season.

The 2008 season officially began on 22 February and concluded with the grand final between Wollongong FC and the Sutherland Sharks on 7 September.

Before the start of the season, all the 2008 teams competed in the Johnny Warren Cup, the official pre-season tournament. On 16 February, Sydney Olympic defeated the Sutherland Sharks 2 goals to 1 at Seymour Shaw Park to win the Johnny Warren Cup.

Throughout the season many Premier League, Super League, Division One and Division Two teams competed in an FA Cup-style knockout competition in which the Bankstown City Lions and Sydney Olympic contested the grand final with Bankstown prevailing 3–1 winners.

Changes from Previous Season
The number of teams competing increased from 10 to 12, with the inclusion of the West Sydney Berries and the Macarthur Rams. The regular season remained a home-away round-robin format, thus increasing the number of rounds from 18 to 22. The final series was therefore also adapted. The number of teams competing in the finals series increased from 4 to 5. The finals series used a 5-team McIntyre system to determine the champions.

Clubs
Teams promoted from Super League:
(After the end of the 2007 season.)
West Sydney Berries
Macarthur Rams

Teams relegated to Super League:
(After the end of the 2007 season.)
Nil

Regular season

League table

Results

Finals series

Qualifying Finals

Semi-finals

Preliminary final

Grand final

Gold Medal Dinner
At the end of the season, Football NSW hosted the Gold Medal Dinner, where players, coaches and referees were awarded for their work throughout the Premier League season.

All-Stars Team

Based on a points system in which all match reporters took part in during the course of the 22 rounds, eleven players were selected in various positions highlighting their performances for season 2008.

Goalkeeper: Matthew Nash (A.P.I.A. Leichhardt Tigers)

Defence: Emmanuel Zunino (Sydney Olympic), Pedj Bojić (Sutherland Sharks), Danial Cummins (Wollongong FC), Shane Webb (Bankstown City Lions)

Midfield: Nahuel Arrarte (Marconi Stallions), Robbie Cattanach (Manly United), Brendan Gan (Sutherland Sharks), Christopher Boyle (Sydney United)

Attack: Robert Younis (A.P.I.A. Leichhardt Tigers), Brad Boardman (Sutherland Sharks)

Coach:  Brian "Bomber" Brown

See also
NSW Premier League
Football NSW

References

External links
NSW Premier League Official website

Nsw Premier League Season, 2008
New South Wales Premier League seasons
Nsw Premier League Season, 2008